The swisspartners Group is a Swiss wealth management and asset management firm, comprising several legal entities. They have offices in Zurich, Geneva, Vaduz (Liechtenstein) and Feldkirch (Austria) .  The swisspartners Group is one of the largest independent investment management firms in Switzerland, in operation for more than 20 years.

History
The swisspartners Group's first legal entity, swisspartners Investment Network AG, was incorporated in 1993 as a joint stock corporation under Swiss law.  It is a member of the Swiss Association of Asset Managers (SAAM)  and regulated by its Self-Regulation Body (SRO).  In 1995, swisspartners Insurance Company was launched.   The swisspartners Wealth Management AG was founded in 1997. In 1998, swisspartners Investment Network AG opened a branch in Basel, Switzerland, which was closed in 2013. The swisspartners Versicherung AG was founded in 2002 and swisspartners AG was launched in 2003, both Liechtenstein based companies under the control of the Liechtensteinische Finanzmarktaufsicht FMA. The swisspartners Investment Network AG opened an additional subsidiary in 2003 in Geneva, Switzerland and in 2008 swisspartners Advisors Ltd. was founded. The swisspartners Group shares are held by partners active in the business (85%) and financial investors (15%).

In 2017, swisspartners Group performed a fundamental reorganisation in order to prepare for future client and regulatory needs and requirements. Since 01.01.2017, the newly founded swisspartners Group AG, Zurich, was positioned as the new holding company. The Swiss and non-EU asset management business is processed in the newly founded swisspartners AG, Zurich (member of SAAM and SRO)and the mid- and back office processes as well as the infrastructure management of the whole swisspartners group is organised in the newly founded swisspartners Corporate AG, Zurich.

Organization
The swisspartners Group is active in three areas of business – asset management, life insurance and fiduciary services. The Liechtenstein-based swisspartners AG serves as a “EU-Passport”, thus the company is allowed to perform assent management services in the European Union. Due to its SEC-registration, swisspartners Advisors Ltd.
, is allowed to serve U.S. citizens.

In the Media
swisspartners avoided criminal charges "as a direct result of its decision to self-report misconduct" as explained by the U.S. Attorney for the Southern District of New York, Preet Bharara. The swisspartners agreed in May 2014 to pay $4.4 million to the United States to settle a probe concerning whether or not it helped US taxpayers to evade their federal income taxes.

References

External links
 

Financial services companies established in 1993
Financial services companies of Switzerland